Ella Aleksandrovna Diehl (born 5 August 1978; née Karachkova) is a badminton player from Russia.

Career 
Diehl was selected to join the national team in 1995. She had won girls' doubles silver medal at the 1995 European Junior Championships, and also one silver and two bronze in 1997 in team, girls' singles and doubles respectively.

In her home country Russia, Diehl has won 14 national titles as of 2009. In 2000 and 2008, she competed at the Summer Olympics.

Diehl played at the 2005 World Championships in Anaheim, United States. In the women's singles event she reached the second round before losing to Salakjit Ponsana of Thailand.

In October 2005, Diehl won the women's doubles event at the Scottish International Open in Glasgow, and two weeks later followed this up by winning the women's singles event at the Irish International in Lisburn. The next year she won the Irish International again.

In 2010, Diehl won the bronze medal at the European Individual Championships in Manchester, and in June 2010, claimed the European Tour circuit finals title, beating Susan Egelstaff in the final in three sets. 2010 also saw Diehl beat current world champion Lu Lan of China to reach the semi final of Swiss Open.

Achievements

European Championships 
Women's singles

European Junior Championships 
Girls' singles

Girls' doubles

BWF Grand Prix 
The BWF Grand Prix had two levels, the Grand Prix and Grand Prix Gold. It was a series of badminton tournaments sanctioned by the Badminton World Federation (BWF) and played between 2007 and 2017. The World Badminton Grand Prix was sanctioned by the International Badminton Federation from 1983 to 2006.

Women's singles

Women's doubles

 BWF Grand Prix Gold tournament
 BWF & IBF Grand Prix tournament

BWF International Challenge/Series 
Women's singles

Women's doubles

Mixed doubles

  BWF International Challenge tournament
  BWF International Series tournament

Personal life 
On 23 June 2007, in Germany, Karachkova married the Swiss junior badminton team coach, Rainer Diehl of Germany, whom she met in 2000. She lives with her husband in Yverdon, Switzerland. There is a child from the first marriage. On 11 October 2011, the duo had a daughter, Lea.

References

External links 
 IBF player profile

1978 births
Living people
Sportspeople from Samara, Russia
Russian female badminton players
Badminton players at the 2000 Summer Olympics
Badminton players at the 2008 Summer Olympics
Olympic badminton players of Russia
21st-century Russian women